Humberto Terzano (born 1911, date of death unknown) was an Argentine equestrian. He competed in two events at the 1948 Summer Olympics.

References

1911 births
Year of death missing
Argentine male equestrians
Olympic equestrians of Argentina
Argentine dressage riders
Equestrians at the 1948 Summer Olympics
Pan American Games medalists in equestrian
Pan American Games silver medalists for Argentina
Equestrians at the 1951 Pan American Games
Place of birth missing
Medalists at the 1951 Pan American Games